Xenophysogobio nudicorpa is a species of cyprinid fish endemic to China.

References

Xenophysogobio
Fish described in 1986